Guillermo Dannaher (1890-1927) was an Argentine footballer, who played as a forward for the Club Atlético Atlanta, Huracán and Quilmes. He also played for the Argentina national team, disputing the Copa Udaondo, Copa Premio Honor Argentino and Copa Círculo de Prensa of 1913.

References 

1890 births
1927 deaths
Argentine footballers
Argentina international footballers
Club Atlético Huracán footballers
Quilmes Atlético Club footballers
Argentine people of Irish descent
Club Atlético Atlanta footballers
Association football forwards
Río de la Plata
Footballers from Rosario, Santa Fe